Tsivilsk (Śĕrpü) is a town and the administrative center of Tsivilsky District of the Chuvash Republic, Russia, located  from the republic's capital city of Cheboksary, at the crossroads of the highways from Nizhny Novgorod to Kazan and from Tsivilsk to Ulyanovsk. Population:

History
The original fortress at Tsivilsk was founded in 1589 as a Russian military outpost among the Chuvash population.

Administrative and municipal status
Within the framework of administrative divisions, Tsivilsk serves as the administrative center of Tsivilsky District. As an administrative division, it is incorporated within Tsivilsky District as Tsivilskoye Urban Settlement. As a municipal division, this administrative unit also has urban settlement status and is a part of Tsivilsky Municipal District.

Infrastructure

References

Notes

Sources

Cities and towns in Chuvashia
Tsivilsky Uyezd
Populated places established in 1589